The 1824 Maine gubernatorial election took place on September 13, 1824. Incumbent Democratic-Republican Governor Albion Parris won re-election to a fourth term.

Results

Notes

References

Gubernatorial
1824
Maine
September 1824 events